Epsilon Piscium (Epsilon Psc, ε Piscium, ε Psc) is the Bayer designation for a star approximately  away from the Earth, in the constellation Pisces. It is a yellow-orange star of the G9 III or K0 III spectral type, meaning it has a surface temperature around 5,000 kelvins. This is a normal giant star, slightly cooler in surface temperature, yet brighter and larger than the Sun. It is a suspected occultation double, with both stars having the same magnitude, separated by 0.25 arcsecond.

Naming
In Japanese, 悠翔星 (Haruto-boshi), meaning "Soaring Forever Star," refers to the Japanese description of ε Piscium.

Planetary system
In 2021, a gas giant planetary candidate was detected by radial velocity method.

References

K-type giants
Pisces (constellation)
Piscium, Epsilon
BD+07 153
Piscium, 071
004906
006186
0294
Hypothetical planetary systems